Matthew Stonier (born 24 September 2001) is an English international athlete. He has represented England at the Commonwealth Games.

Biography
Stonier was educated at The King's School, Canterbury and Loughborough University. In 2022, he won the Emsley Carr Mile before competing in the Diamond League.

In 2022, he was selected for the men's 1500 metres event at the 2022 Commonwealth Games in Birmingham.

References

2001 births
Living people
English male middle-distance runners
British male middle-distance runners
Commonwealth Games competitors for England
Athletes (track and field) at the 2022 Commonwealth Games